Tetrahalodiboranes are a class of diboron compounds with the formula B2X4 (X = F, Cl, Br, I). These compounds were first discovered in the 1920s, but, after some interest in the middle of the 20th century, were largely ignored in research. Compared to other diboron compounds, tetrahalodiboranes are fairly unstable and historically have been difficult to prepare; thus, their use in synthetic chemistry is largely unexplored, and research on tetrahalodiboranes has stemmed from fundamental interest in their reactivity. Recently, there has been a resurgence in interest in tetrahalodiboranes, particularly in diboron tetrafluoride as a reagent to promote doping of silicon with B+for use in semiconductor devices.

Structure 

Because the perpendicular and planar geometries of tetrahalodiboranes are generally very close in energy, the energetic difference between these two structures has been the most investigated aspect of the geometry of these molecules. As it turns out, the difference is dependent on the identity of the halide in the compound. B2F4 adopts a planar geometry ( symmetry) in both as a solid and in the gas phase. The barrier to rotation, however, is small (only 0.42 kcal/mo)l. B2Cl4, however, adopts a planar geometry when crystalized but favors the perpendicular geometry ( symmetry) in the gas phase. Computations of the relative stability of the two conformers indicate that the  geometry is ~2kcal/mol lower in energy; the planar geometry in the solid phase is thought to be due to packing effects. Continuing this trend, computational modeling and experimental results agree that B2Br4  and B2I4 favor the perpendicular  geometry.

Synthesis 
The first synthesis of a tetrahalodiborane was reported by Stock et al. in 1925 where the authors reduced BCl3to form B2Cl4 by running a current between zinc electrodes immersed in liquid BCl3. Later work explored gas phase syntheses of B2Cl4 using gaseous BCl3 and mercury electrodes. Early characterization of B2Cl4 reported the to be a colorless, pyrophoric liquid that decomposes at temperatures above 0 °C. B2F4 was not synthesized until 1958 when Finch and Schlesinger reported the successful synthesis of B2Cl4 with antimony trifluoride to form B2F4. Unlike B2Cl4, B2F4 is stable at room temperature. The heavier tetrahalodiboranes, B2Br4 and B2I4, were first published in 1949  by Schlesinger et al. and Schumb respectively. B2Br4 was first accessed by reacting B2Cl4 and BBr3. B2I4 was first synthesized using electrodeless radiofrequency discharge to reduce BI3. B2Br4 is stable at temperatures below -40 °C, while B2I4 is stable below 0 °C. B2I4 also degrades when exposed to light. Decomposition of B2I4 at elevated temperatures yields a BI3 and a black solid found to be a mixture of 
 and 
</chem>.

The initial interest in tetrahaloiboranes was largely fundamental, and more applied consideration of tetrahalodiboranes was largely limited by the difficulty of synthesis and the low stability of isolated compounds. Recent improvements in the synthesis of tetrahalodiboranes has yielded more convenient solution phase syntheses of B2F4, B2Cl4, B2Br4, and B2I4. The solution phase synthesis of B2Br4 first reported by Noth et al in 1981 has not been improved upon. To form B2Br4 in solution, B2(OMe)4 is treated with BBr3. Other tetrahalodiboranes can be accessed from B2Br4 in the solution phase by reacting with SbF3, GaCl3, or BI3 to form B2F4, B2Cl4, or B2I4 respectively. These improvements in synthetic methods have opened the door for exploring potential applications of tetrahalodiboranes; while this interest has been fairly limited thus far, researchers have begun to explore the use of tetrahalodiboranes as synthetic building blocks and for use in industrial applications. Notably, recent publications discussing tetrahalodiboranes have been largely in patent literature discussing the use of B2F4 to replace BF3 as a feed chemical to dope semiconductors with boron ions.

Reactivity

Lewis base adduct formation 

The boron atoms in tetrahalodiboranes are highly lewis acidic and readily form adducts with neutral lewis bases. Though the formation of these complexes is usually energetically favorable, early attempts to form these lewis acid base complexes were hindered by the lability of the halogen substituents; prior to the 1992 publication of three additional phosphane-tetrahalodiborane(4) adducts, only three lewis acid-lewis base adducts had been reported. Other work has described many more lewis acid-lewis base adducts that form readily, but also outline how stability challenges with tetrahalodiboranes persist even in stabilized complexes. Examples of these unstable tetrahalodiborane-lewis base adducts include the bis-diethyl ether adduct formed with B2Cl4 or B2F4, the bis-adduct of B2Cl4 and either SH2 or PH3, and adducts formed by  B2Cl4 or B2F4 and weak phosphine donors such as PCl3 or PBr3.

There are, however, some adducts that are stable beyond room temperature. B2Cl4 and B2F4 both form stable mono- and bis-adducts with aprotic nitrogen donors. The first of these stable lewis base-tetrahalodiborane adducts was published in 2012 by Braunshcweig et al. showing that B2Br4(IDip)2 (where IDip=1,3-bis(2,6-diisopropylphenyl)-imidazole-2-ylidene) is stable at ambient temperature. B2Br4(IDip)2 could then be reduced to form B2Br2(IDip)2, a stable diborene, and could ultimately be reduced further to form B2(IDip)2 the first isolable diboryne. Since this discovery, the Braunschweig group has published a number of other stable tetrahalodiborane adducts including some monoadducts and some asymetrical bis adducts. These adducts are typically characterized using ^{11}B NMR.

Reaction with transition metals 
There has been some investigation of the reactivity of tetrahalodiboranes with transition metals. Norman et al. reported reactivity of B2F4 with PtL2 to form cis-[Pt(BF2)2L2] where .

Because it was expected that heavier tetrahalodiboranes might have more reactive boron-halide bonds, the reactivity of B2I4 with electron rich Pt(PCy3)2 was explored. The greater lability of the B-I bond relative to the B-F bond in B2F4 allowed for the formation of a diplatnum complex with borryl ligands and a bridging [B2I4].

Reaction with boriranylideneboranes 
In 2001, Seibert et al. showed that three boriranylideneboranes first synthesized by Berndt et al. in the 1980s could be reacted with tetrahalodiboranes to yield interesting boron containing compounds shown in the scheme below. In the first reaction, both the chlorine and fluorine containing compounds were synthesized in good yields, but the fluorine compound was noticeably less stable. The all compounds shown below were characterized by 11B,1H and 13C NMR.

Addition to unsaturated hydrocarbons 

Tetrahalodiboranes can add to unsaturated hydrocarbons. Schlesinger et al. published 1,2-additions of B2Cl4 to ethylene and acetylene. Later work explored the reactivity of B2Cl4 with other alkenes, alkynes and dienes and showed that B2F4 can react similarly. B2Br4can also add to alkenes. In 2015, Brown et al. used electronic structure calculation to provide mechanistic information on some of these (uncatalyzed) boron additions. Most interestingly, the authors were able to provide mechanistic information explaining the stereospecificity of the reaction of B2Cl4 with 1,2 disubstituted alkenes.

References 

Wikipedia Student Program
Boron halides